Bardsley as a place name can refer to:

 Bardsley, Greater Manchester, on the Oldham–Tameside boundary in England.
Frances Bardsley Academy for Girls in London, UK

Bardsley as a surname can refer to:
 Cuthbert Bardsley (1907–1991) former Bishop of Coventry
Cyril  Bardsley (1870–1940), Anglican bishop
 David Bardsley (born 1964), English footballer
 Edwin Bardsley (1883–1916), English footballer
Eric Bardsley (1903–1958), Australian Rugby Union player
Gibson Bardsley (born 1989), American soccer player
Grace Bardsley (1920–1972), Australian Aboriginal rights activist and political activist
James Lomax Bardsley (1801–1876), English physician
John Bardsley (1835–1914), Bishop of Carlisle, England
John Bardsley (footballer), English footballer
Karen Bardsley (born 1984), is American-born, English football goalkeeper
Kristian Bardsley (born 1972), Australian rules football player
 Lizzy Bardsley (born 1973), English reality TV contestant
 Michele Bardsley (born 1970), American writer of romantic fiction 
 Phil Bardsley (born 1985), English footballer
Robert Bardsley (1890–1952), English cricket 
Samuel Argent Bardsley (1764–1851), English physician
Tim Bardsley (born 1954), Canadian politician and lawyer
Tony Bardsley (born 1945), Canadian tennis player
 Warren Bardsley (1882–1954), Australian test cricketer

Fictional characters 

 Frank Bardsley, from Coronation Street